Hon. (Amb) Mohamed Maalim Mohamud' is a Kenyan politician who is the current Senator for Mandera County. He is also the Chairman of the Senate Finance and Budget Committee. From 2008 - 2011, he was the Assistant Minister (Electricity and Renewable Energy) in the Ministry of Energy.  He belongs to the Jubilee Party.

Mohamud is a member of the Institution of Engineers of Kenya, a registered engineer with the Engineers’ Registration Board of Kenya, and an associate member of the Chartered Institute of Arbitrators. He holds a Bachelor of Science Kenya.

Kenya.

References

Living people
Orange Democratic Movement politicians
Members of the National Assembly (Kenya)
1953 births
Ambassadors of Kenya to Egypt
Ambassadors of Kenya to Tunisia
Ambassadors of Kenya to Morocco
Ambassadors of Kenya to Eritrea
Chiefs of the Order of the Burning Spear